Sihawal is one of the 230 Vidhan Sabha (Legislative Assembly) constituencies of Madhya Pradesh state in central India.

It is part of Sidhi District.

Members of Legislative Assembly

Election results

2013

References

Assembly constituencies of Madhya Pradesh